Graham Frederick Young (7 September 1947 – 1 August 1990), also known as the Teacup Poisoner and the St Albans Poisoner, was an English serial killer who killed his victims via poison.

Obsessed with poisons from an early age, Young started poisoning the food and drink of relatives and school friends. He was caught when his teacher became suspicious and contacted the police. Young pleaded guilty to three non-fatal poisonings and, at age 14, was detained at Broadmoor Hospital. Young later took responsibility for the death of his stepmother, though this has not been proven. 

After being released in 1971, Young got a job in a factory in Bovingdon, Hertfordshire, where he began poisoning his work colleagues, resulting in two fatalities and several critical illnesses. Young was convicted on two counts of murder and two counts of attempted murder in 1972. He served most of his life sentence at HM Prison Parkhurst, where he died of a heart attack in 1990.

The Young case made headlines in the United Kingdom and led to a public debate over the release of mentally ill offenders. Within hours of his conviction, the British government announced two inquiries into the issues it raised. The Butler Committee led to widespread reforms in mental health services, while the passage of the 1972 Poisons Act put severe restrictions on the purchase of deadly poisons. Young's life story inspired the 1995 film The Young Poisoner's Handbook.

Early life and crimes
Graham Young was born on 7 September 1947 to Frederick and Bessie Young in Neasden, Middlesex; he had an older sister, Winifred Young. Younger's mother died of tuberculous when he was fourteen weeks old and was subsequently sent to live with an uncle and aunt, while his sister went to live with their grandparents. Several years later, Young's father remarried to another woman named Molly, and the family were re-united.

Young was fascinated from an early age by poisons and their effects, and considered Victorian poisoner William Palmer to be a personal hero. Young also read extensively about black magic, Adolf Hitler and Nazi Germany. In 1959, as he passed his eleven-plus and went to grammar school, he started to read books on advanced toxicology.

In 1961, Young acquired antimony from a local chemist, signing the poisons register in the name "M.E. Evans"; his knowledge of poisons and chemistry convinced the chemist that he was older than he appeared. Beginning in February he began poisoning members of his family. First his stepmother suffered vomiting, diarrhoea and excruciating stomach pain, which she initially dismissed as bilious attacks. Before long his father suffered similar stomach cramps, debilitating him for days at a time. Soon after, his sister became sick on a couple of occasions over the summer. Shortly afterwards, Young himself fell violently ill. It even seemed as if the mystery bug had spread beyond their household: a couple of Young's school friends had similarly been repeatedly absent from school, both suffering from similar symptoms.

In November 1961, Young's sister was served a cup of tea by her brother one morning but found its taste so sour she took only one mouthful before she threw it away. While on the train to work an hour later, she began to hallucinate, had to be helped out of the station and was eventually taken to hospital, where doctors came to the conclusion that she had somehow been exposed to the poisonous Atropa belladonna. Young was confronted by his father, but who claimed that Winifred had been using the family's teacups to mix shampoo. Unconvinced, Young's father searched his room but found nothing incriminating. Nevertheless, he warned his son to be more careful in future when "messing about with those bloody chemicals".

On Easter Saturday, 21 April 1962, Young's stepmother died. Her death was attributed to a prolapsed cervical disc, which was believed to have resulted from a road accident. Much later, Young told police that he poisoned her with a lethal dose of thallium. At her wake, Young poisoned a male relative after lacing a jar of mustard pickle with antimony. Shortly afterwards his father became seriously ill and was taken to hospital, where he was told that he was suffering from antimony poisoning and one more dose would have killed him. Young's aunt, who knew of his fascination with poisons, became suspicious, as did a science teacher who discovered several bottles of poison in his school desk. The teacher and the headmaster arranged for Young to be interviewed by a psychiatrist posing as a careers advisor, who contacted police after Young revealed his extensive knowledge of poisons and toxicology.

Young was arrested on 23 May 1962 after returning home from school. Vials of thallium and antimony were found in his possession. When questioned by police, he confessed to poisoning his father, stepmother, sister and a school friend. Psychiatrist Dr Christopher Fysh testified that Young had a psychopathic disorder rather than a mental illness and had failed "to develop a normal moral sense." He felt it was "extremely likely" that Young would re-offend and recounted a conversation in which Young said: "I am missing my antimony. I miss the power it gives me." Fysh recommended that Young be detained at Broadmoor Hospital, an institution for patients with mental disorders who have committed criminal offences. Dr Donald Blair, another psychiatrist, concurred with Fysh's viewpoint.

Young pleaded guilty to three charges of poisoning his father, sister and school friend and was convicted of "malicious administration of a noxious thing to inflict grievous bodily harm". He was not charged for murdering his stepmother, as her autopsy report did not list poison as the cause of death. The judge, Justice Melford Stevenson, ruled that Young was to be detained under Section 60 of the Mental Health Act at Broadmoor. Furthermore, he was not to be released for fifteen years without the approval of the Home Secretary.

Broadmoor
At age 14, Young was among the youngest-ever inmates in Broadmoor's history. Soon after his arrival, John Berridge, a fellow inmate, died of cyanide poisoning. Young was suspected by some staff and inmates, not least because he enjoyed explaining in detail how cyanide could be extracted from laurel leaves; the grounds around Broadmoor were covered with laurel bushes. However, his involvement was never proven and the death was officially ruled a suicide. Later, Harpic was found in a nurse's coffee and the contents of a missing packet of sugar soap were discovered in a tea urn.

Young continued to read medical and toxicology textbooks, obtained from Broadmoor's library. He also continued his interest in Nazism, reading William Shirer's The Rise and Fall of the Third Reich and Lord Russell's The Scourge of the Swastika. At one point, Young grew a toothbrush moustache and took to mimicking the speeches of Hitler and listening to musical compositions by Richard Wagner, who had been one of Hitler's idols.

In 1965, Young first applied for release from Broadmoor. His father and sister attended the tribunal and stated that if Young was released, none of his relatives would be willing to house him; his father also insisted that his son should "never be released". Young's application was rejected. Five years later, in June 1970, Broadmoor psychiatrist Edgar Udwin wrote to the Home Secretary to recommend Young's release, announcing that he was "no longer obsessed with poisons, violence and mischief. And he is no longer a danger to others." However, Young remarked to a Broadmoor nurse: "When I get out, I'm going to kill one person for every year I've spent in this place."

Later crimes
Young was released from Broadmoor in 1971, after eight years' detention. He initially stayed with his sister and her husband in Hemel Hempstead. Within weeks he had resumed his interest in poisons, but an attempt to acquire poison from John Bell & Croyden in Wigmore Street was unsuccessful, as the chemist refused to sell them without written authorization. Young duly returned with the required authorization on Bedford College headed notepaper and was sold 25 g of antimony potassium tartrate. He told the chemist that he needed it for a qualitative and quantitative analysis. Young later returned to the same chemist to purchase 25 g of thallium.

Poisoning of Trevor Sparkes
Young attended a storekeeping training course in Slough and stayed at a hostel in nearby Cippenham. He befriended 34-year-old Trevor Sparkes, another resident of the hostel, and the two occasionally visited a pub together or shared a bottle of wine in Sparkes' room. Young would later confess to poisoning Sparkes with antimony sodium tartrate. On the night of February 10, Sparkes fell violently ill, exhibiting diarrhoea, pins and needles in his legs and pains in his testicles; earlier in the evening he had accepted a glass of water from Young. Sparkes' symptoms returned periodically over the following months. He felt so ill during a football match that he had to leave the pitch after a few minutes. Specialists were unable to pinpoint the cause, variously diagnosing it as a kidney infection, bowel infection, urinary tract infection or stomach infection. Sparkes left Slough in April 1971 and gradually recovered, though he never played football again.

Bovingdon
Young secured a job as assistant storekeeper at John Hadland Laboratories in Bovingdon, Hertfordshire, near his sister's home in Hemel Hempstead. The company manufactured thallium bromide-iodide infrared lenses, which were used in military equipment. However, no thallium was stored on site, necessitating Young obtaining his supplies of the poison from a London chemist. On his application, Young falsely claimed that his lack of employment history was because he had suffered a nervous breakdown following the death of his mother in a car accident. His employers received references as part of his rehabilitation from Broadmoor, but were not informed that he was a convicted poisoner and a former Broadmoor patient. Young left Slough and rented a room in Maynard Road, Hemel Hempstead, at £4 per week.

Young's new colleagues found him unpredictable; he could be surly and kept to himself, but on other days he was more cheerful. During breaks he usually sat alone reading, invariably a book on one of his favourite subjects: war, chemistry, the Nazis or famous murderers. He was not talkative unless one of his favourite topics was being discussed. Young's duties at Hadland included collecting drinks from the tea trolley in the corridor and bringing them to the storeroom. Each employee had their own mug, which made it easier for him to target specific individuals for poisoning.

Soon after Young's arrival at Hadland, he started poisoning his co-workers, focusing on his immediate colleagues in the storerooms. His modus operandi was to slip poison, usually antimony or thallium, into their tea or coffee. Victims would fall ill with symptoms that included vomiting, stomach pains, nausea and diarrhoea. Initially the mysterious illness was assumed to be a virus and was nicknamed the "Bovingdon Bug". Other explanations put forward were contamination of the local water supply and radioactivity from a disused airfield nearby.

Murder of Bob Egle
Young's first victim in Bovington was 59-year-old Bob Egle, a storeroom manager at Hadland and Young's immediate superior. Egle, a veteran of the Dunkirk evacuation, was often asked by Young about his wartime experiences. Egle began to fall ill in June 1971, weeks after Young's arrival at the company, taking several days off work with diarrhea and severe stomach pains. Egle's health improved after a week-long holiday, but on his return Young put a lethal dose of thallium in his afternoon tea. His condition deteriorated rapidly from this point, consisting of intense back pain and numbness in his fingers and feet. Egle was transferred to the intensive care unit at St Albans City Hospital, where paralysis set in. Young seemingly showed a strong concern for Egle, repeatedly contacting the hospital for updates on his progress. Egle finally died on 7 July 1971. A post-mortem attributed Egle's death to a rare form of polyneuritis known as Guillain–Barré syndrome. 

Young was chosen to accompany managing director Godfrey Foster to Egle's funeral as a representative of the department Egle had managed. Foster recalled Young remarking how sad it was that "Bob should come through the terrors of Dunkirk only to fall victim to some strange virus."

Poisoning of Ron Hewitt and Diana Smart
During Egle's absences, Young targeted his assistant Ron Hewitt, poisoning his tea with antimony. Hewitt had already accepted a job at another company and was working his notice (Young was specifically hired as his replacement). After leaving the company, he suffered no further symptoms. As a result of Egle's death and Hewitt's departure, Young was promoted to head storeman for a probationary period. For the next few months, his poisonings were limited to small doses of antimony in his co-worker Diana Smart's tea, usually when she annoyed him. Young wrote in his diary: "Di [Diana Smart] irritated me yesterday so I packed her off home with an attack of sickness. I only gave her something to shake her up. I now regret that I didn't give her a larger dose, capable of laying her up for a few days."

Poisoning of David Tilson and Jethro Batt
On 8 October 1971, Young put thallium acetate in David Tilson's tea. Tilson found the tea too sweet for his liking (Young had added sugar to disguise any unusual taste from the thallium) and therefore did not drink it all. Young administered a second dose of thallium a week later. Tilson was admitted to hospital with numb legs, breathing difficulties and chest pains. His skin was so tender he could not endure the weight of the bedsheets, and all his hair fell out. Young had a back-up plan to visit Tilson in hospital and offer him a bottle of brandy laced with more thallium. Subsequently, Tilson recovered, though he was left permanently impotent by the poisoning.

At the same time he was poisoning Tilson, Young also began poisoning another Hadland employee, Jethro Batt. Batt had become friendly with Young and would give him a ride home to Hemel Hempstead. Young admitted to administering 4 g of thallium to Batt in two doses, enough to kill him. However, Batt found the coffee Young had made for him too strong and did not drink it all. Nevertheless, Batt was admitted to hospital with stomach and chest pains, and his hair fell out. The poisoning made him suicidal. Batt ultimately recovered, but like Tilson he was also left impotent. Young apparently felt some remorse for poisoning Batt, writing in his diary: "I feel rather ashamed in my action in harming J [Batt]."

Murder of Fred Biggs
Fred Biggs, a 56-year-old local councillor and part-time employee at Hadland, was poisoned by Young with antimony, prompting the typical "Bovingdon bug" symptoms. Then, on 30 October 1971, Young put three doses of thallium acetate in Biggs' tea. By the following day, Biggs had developed chest pains and had trouble walking. Within days, he was admitted to Hemel Hempstead General Hospital, then transferred to the Whittington Hospital in North London, followed by the London National Hospital for Nervous Diseases (now part of the National Hospital for Neurology and Neurosurgery). His central nervous system deteriorated to the point that he could not speak and had trouble breathing, and his skin began to peel off. Young expressed concern for Biggs' condition, continually telephoning Biggs' wife and the hospital directly to make enquiries. Biggs finally died on 19 November 1971.

Investigation and arrest
The management at Hadland became so concerned about the mysterious sickness that they initiated an investigation. Meanwhile, some of Young's co-workers began to have suspicions about him. Smart noticed that Young was never affected by the bug and suggested he might be a carrier of the "virus". Philip Doggett informed the management of Young's unhealthy interest in poisons. The firm's medical officer, Dr Iain Anderson, told staff that he had ruled out heavy metal poisoning as a possible cause, which led to an argument with Young, who insisted that the symptoms displayed by victims pointed to this diagnosis. Intrigued by the young storeman who seemed knowledgeable about medicine, Anderson sought out Young after the meeting and quizzed him further. He quickly discovered that Young had a deep knowledge of poisons and toxicology, which prompted John Hadland, the firm's owner, to contact the police. The investigating officers noticed that the onset of the "Bovingdon bug" coincided with Young's arrival at the company. A background check revealed his earlier poisoning convictions.

Young was arrested at the home of his aunt and uncle in Sheerness, Kent, on 20 November 1971. Nothing incriminating was found on his person. He denied any wrongdoing, but as he was being led away his aunt overheard him ask the officers "which one is it you're doing me for?" When police searched his bedsit, they discovered a large stash of bottles containing poisons, including 434 milligrams of thallium and 32.33 grams of antimony, the latter 200 times a lethal dose. Other poisons in his possession included atropine, aconitine and digitalis. His lodgings were also covered in Nazi paraphernalia, including swastikas and photos of Nazi figures. Police also discovered a detailed diary that Young had kept, noting the doses he had administered, their effects, and whether he was going to allow each person to live or die. Upon further questioning by police, Young admitted that the initials in the diary referred to his co-workers ('F' was Fred Biggs, 'D' was David Tilson and so on).

Young confessed to poisoning Egle, Biggs, Batt, Tilson and Trevor Sparkes, and said that he deliberately used different poisons in order to confuse doctors. He also boasted of having committed the "perfect murder" by killing his stepmother, Molly Young. He spent twenty minutes explaining to the officers the effects that thallium has on the human body. When asked why he had poisoned people who were his friends and colleagues, Young responded: "I suppose I had ceased to see them as a people - at least, a part of me had. They were simply guinea pigs."

Trial and prison
Young was charged with two counts of murder, two counts of attempted murder, four counts of administering poison with intent to injure and four alternative counts of administering poison with intent to cause grievous bodily harm. He pleaded not guilty, which made it difficult to find a barrister willing to represent him; the trial date had to be postponed several times. Eventually, Sir Arthur Irvine QC agreed to defend Young. John Leonard QC led the prosecution for the Crown. The judge was Mr Justice Eveleigh. The trial was held at St Albans Crown Court and started on 19 June 1972.

Due to safeguards protecting defendants, the jury could not be told of Young's previous convictions for poisoning. Young retracted his earlier confession to the police, claiming he had only made it in order to get some rest. Nevertheless, the evidence against him was strong. The prosecution called 75 witnesses to give testimony; Young himself was the only witness in his defence. Excerpts from Young's diary were read out in court. Young claimed the diary was a fantasy for a novel. Examination of Fred Biggs' internal organs found thallium in his intestines, kidneys, muscles, bones and brain tissue. The cremated remains of Bob Egle, which had not yet been scattered, were also analysed and found to contain 9 mg of thallium. The latter was the first instance of cremated ashes being used as evidence in a murder conviction.

On 29 June 1972, after one hour and 38 minutes of deliberation, the jury found Young guilty of two counts of murder (Bob Egle and Fred Biggs), two counts of attempted murder (Jethro Batt and David Tilson) and two counts of administering poison with intent to injure (Diana Smart and Ronald Hewitt). He was found not guilty of administering poison to Trevor Sparkes and Peter Buck, and was acquitted on all four counts of administering poison with intent to cause grievous bodily harm. Through his counsel, Young requested that he be sent to a conventional prison rather than return to Broadmoor. His request was granted and he was sentenced to life imprisonment, to be served at Park Lane Hospital, later changing to Ashworth Hospital, in Maghull.

While at Ashworth, Young befriended Moors murderer Ian Brady, with whom he shared a fascination for Nazi Germany. Brady's 2001 book, The Gates of Janus, in which he discusses various serial killers, includes a chapter on Young. Brady wrote that Young "was genuinely asexual, finding even discussion of sexual matters not only uninteresting but also distinctly distasteful... Power and death were his aphrodisiacs and raisons d’être." Elsewhere Brady stated that "it was difficult not to empathise with Graham Young."

Young died in his cell at HM Prison Parkhurst on the evening of 1 August 1990, one month before his 43rd birthday. The cause of death was listed as myocardial infarction. As Young had no history of heart disease, it has been speculated that he either committed suicide or was murdered by prisoners or prison staff who did not feel safe around him.

Aftermath
On 29 June 1972, the day Young's trial ended, Home Secretary Reginald Maudling gave a statement in the House of Commons about the issues raised by the case. He confirmed that more safeguards were to be introduced governing the release of mentally ill offenders. Henceforth, no patient at a special hospital was to be discharged without two concurring recommendations from psychiatrists. Supervision of released patients was also to be improved.

Maudling ordered a review of current procedures for releasing offenders from psychiatric hospitals. The review was to be carried out by a three-man committee headed by Sir Carl Aarvold, Recorder of London. Their findings were published in January 1973. Maudling also announced an inquiry to review the management of mentally ill offenders in the criminal justice system, to be chaired by Lord Butler. This led to the Butler Committee's recommendations in 1975, which resulted in the expansion in forensic mental health services with the development of regional (now referred to as medium) secure units in most of the health regions in England and Wales. Prior to that there had been only the high security hospitals of Broadmoor, Ashworth and Rampton.

Following Young's conviction, reports of copycat poisonings appeared in the British press. In April 1973, Howard Grodnow of Ealing committed suicide, having become convinced that he had been poisoned by Young after reading about the case. For the previous eighteen months he had suffered from severe chest pains, which he traced back to an encounter, in a Hemel Hempstead pub, with a young man obsessed with poisons and chemicals. In November 2005, a 16-year-old Japanese schoolgirl was arrested for poisoning her mother with thallium. She claimed to be fascinated by Young and kept an online blog, similar to Young's diary, recording dosage and reactions.

In popular culture
A 1995 film called The Young Poisoner's Handbook is loosely based on Young's life.

Young was the subject of an episode of the ITV series Crime Story, entitled "Terrible Coldness". It was broadcast on 6 October 1993. Young was portrayed by Mark Womack.

During his trial, Young expressed his hope that his waxwork would appear in Madame Tussauds' Chamber of Horrors. He later got his wish and his likeness appeared in the exhibit near those of Hawley Harvey Crippen and John Haigh.

In 2009, a painting of the Kray twins by Young was sold at an auction in Andover for £2,700.

Young's sister wrote a book published by Robert Hale on the 18th January 1973 called Obsessive Poisoner: The Strange Story of Graham Young by his sister Winifred Young.

See also
 List of serial killers in the United Kingdom

References

Further reading

 Michael H. Stone, M.D. & Gary Brucato, Ph.D., The New Evil: Understanding the Emergence of Modern Violent Crime (Amherst, N.Y.: Prometheus Books), pp. 479–480. .

External links

 Crimelibrary entry for Graham Young
 
 Debate in Parliament about the case (Hansard, HC Deb 29 June 1972 vol 839 cc1673-85).
  (Documentary of Young's life presented by Fred Dinenage)

1947 births
1971 murders in the United Kingdom
1990 deaths
English people convicted of murder
English people who died in prison custody
English prisoners sentenced to life imprisonment
English serial killers
Male serial killers
People convicted of murder by England and Wales
People detained at Broadmoor Hospital
People from Neasden
People with antisocial personality disorder
Poisoners
Prisoners sentenced to life imprisonment by England and Wales
Prisoners who died in England and Wales detention
Serial killers who died in prison custody
Thallium poisoning